Rebecca Lynn Hammon (born March 11, 1977) is an American-Russian professional basketball coach and former player who is the head coach of the Las Vegas Aces of the Women’s National Basketball Association (WNBA). She previously served as an assistant coach for the San Antonio Spurs of the National Basketball Association (NBA). A three-time All-American basketball player for the Colorado State Rams, Hammon went on to play for the San Antonio Stars and New York Liberty of the Women's National Basketball Association (WNBA) and for several other teams outside the United States. Hammon, who was born and raised in the United States, became a naturalized Russian citizen in 2008 and represented the Russian national team in the 2008 and 2012 Olympics.

Hammon was hired by the San Antonio Spurs as an assistant coach in 2014. She became the first Russian assistant coach and the second female assistant coach in NBA history. Hammon is also the first Russian and first female full-time assistant coach in any of the four major professional sports in North America. Hammon served as the team's Summer League head coach in 2015; she is the first Russian and woman to be a head coach in that league. On December 30, 2020, Hammon became the first Russian and woman acting head coach in NBA history after Spurs' head coach Gregg Popovich was ejected during a game against the Los Angeles Lakers. A year later in December 2021, she was hired by the Las Vegas Aces to be their head coach. Hammon previously played for the Aces from 2007 to 2014 when the team played in San Antonio and was known as the Stars, and has her number retired by the organization.

Early life and education
Rebecca Lynn Hammon was born in Rapid City, South Dakota. Hammon learned to dribble a basketball at a very young age, playing Nerf ball with her older brother and father, and continued to hone her skills on her home court. She was raised as a devout Christian.

Hammon played basketball at Stevens High School in her hometown of Rapid City, South Dakota. 
As a junior, she was named South Dakota Miss Basketball. As a senior, she was voted the South Dakota Player of the Year after averaging 26 points, 4 rebounds and 5 steals per game. She graduated in 1995, and also was voted female class athlete by her graduating class.

Despite the accolades, she drew little attention from college basketball recruiters, who considered her too small and too slow. She eventually grabbed the attention of a Colorado State assistant coach, and she committed to the Rams.

College career
Hammon's prolific scoring for the Colorado State Rams made her an All-American three times, as well as Colorado Sportswoman of the Year. She led her team to a 33–3 record in the 1998–99 season and helped them advance to the NCAA Tournament's Sweet Sixteen. She was named the WAC Mountain Division player of the year for the 1998–99 season and surpassed University of Utah player Keith Van Horn as the WAC's all-time leading scorer.

Hammon set many Colorado State all-time records, including points (2740), points per game (21.92), field goals made (918), free throws made (539), three-point field goals made (365) and assists (538). She received the Frances Pomeroy Naismith Award from the Women's Basketball Coaches Association as the best senior player under 5 ft 8 in (1.7 m) in 1999.

On November 12, 2004, Hammon was inducted into the Colorado State University Sports Hall of Fame. On January 22, 2005, her number 25 Colorado State jersey was retired at Moby Arena.

Professional playing career
Undrafted during her rookie season, Hammon was signed to the WNBA on May 12, 1999 and joined the New York Liberty. She had a solid rookie season statistically, backing up starting point guard Teresa Weatherspoon. Her aggressive play at both ends of the court made her a favorite among Liberty fans. After the 2003 season, Hammon took over for Weatherspoon as the Liberty's starting point guard and, with Vickie Johnson and Crystal Robinson, became one of the team's co-captains in 2004.

In 2003, her first season with the Tennessee Fury of the National Women's Basketball League (NWBL), Hammon led the league in scoring, averaging 20.6 points per game. In 2004, Hammon signed with the Colorado Chill, a new team in the NWBL, but played in only two games because of an anterior cruciate ligament injury in her right knee sustained in the 2003 season when playing for the Liberty.

Primarily used to provide instant points off the bench, Hammon had a breakout WNBA season in 2003, providing much-needed offense for the Liberty. However, her season was cut short by a knee injury. On August 16, 2005, Hammon scored her 2,000th WNBA career point. At the end of the 2005 season, she was named to the All-WNBA Second Team. In January 2007, she played her WNBA "off season" with Rivas Futura in the Spanish League.

On April 4, 2007, Hammon was traded to the WNBA's San Antonio Silver Stars. Hammon posted career high averages of 18.8 ppg (fourth best) and 5.0 apg in 2007. She led the league in assists that year. While in San Antonio, Hammon earned the nickname "Big Shot Becky" because of her ability to make shots in important moments. Her nickname was derived from "Big Shot Bob", a nickname given to San Antonio Spurs forward Robert Horry.

In 2008, Hammon averaged 17.6 ppg, and 4.9 apg as she led the Silver Stars to a WNBA best record 24–10 and led them into the playoffs for a second straight year. In the conference semi-finals, Hammon scored 30 points in a Game 1 win against the Sacramento Monarchs. San Antonio would eventually win the series and advance to the Western Conference Finals. Following a loss in Game 1 and a win in Game 2, Hammon's 35 points propelled the Silver Stars to a victory in Game 3 against the Los Angeles Sparks. The Silver Stars advanced to the 2008 WNBA Finals, where they were defeated by the Detroit Shock 3–0.

Hammon averaged a career-high 19.5 ppg and 5.0 apg in the 2009 WNBA season. The Silver Stars had a record of 15–19 and lost to the eventual champion Phoenix Mercury in the first round. Hammon was an All-Star as well as a first-team All-WNBA selection. On August 31, 2011, Hammon became the seventh player in WNBA history to score 5,000 points. Later in the year, Hammon scored 37 points in a playoff-clinching win against the Los Angeles Sparks. Hammon retired from the WNBA in 2014. She is a six-time WNBA All-Star.

On August 2, 2015, Hammon was inducted into the Ring of Honor during halftime of the game between the New York Liberty and the Seattle Storm. The Ring of Honor recognizes players who have "made the most significant contributions to the Liberty's tradition of excellence and to the growth of the WNBA." Previous inductees include Vickie Johnson, Teresa Weatherspoon, Rebecca Lobo, Sue Wicks, and Kym Hampton.

On June 25, 2016, the San Antonio Stars retired Hammon's No. 25 jersey prior to the Atlanta Dream game.

Coaching career
Hammon had long expressed aspirations of becoming a coach after her playing career ended. On July 13, 2013, Hammon tore her left anterior cruciate ligament in a game against the Los Angeles Sparks. During her year-long rehabilitation, Hammon attended the NBA's San Antonio Spurs' practices, coaches' meetings, and games, where she was frequently invited to contribute opinions. 

On August 5, 2014, Hammon was hired as an assistant coach for the Spurs, becoming the second female coach in NBA history, after Lisa Boyer worked as a volunteer assistant with the Cleveland Cavaliers and John Lucas in 2001. Hammon's contribution to the staff made an impression on head coach Gregg Popovich. In a media statement released at the time of the hiring announcement, Popovich stated: "I very much look forward to the addition of Becky Hammon to our staff. Having observed her working with our team this past season, I'm confident her basketball IQ, work ethic, and interpersonal skills will be a great benefit to the Spurs."

Hammon has also earned the respect of many NBA players throughout the league. One of basketball's most prolific scorers, Pau Gasol wrote an open letter about female coaches with an emphasis on Hammon; he said, "I’ve played with some of the best players of this generation … and I’ve played under two of the sharpest minds in the history of sports, in Phil Jackson and Gregg Popovich. And I’m telling you: Becky Hammon can coach. I’m not saying she can coach pretty well. I’m not saying she can coach enough to get by. I’m not saying she can coach almost at the level of the NBA’s male coaches. I’m saying: Becky Hammon can coach NBA basketball. Period."

Hammon has been inducted into the Colorado Sports Hall of Fame and has been selected as ESPNW's Woman of the Year.

On July 3, 2015, Hammon became the first-ever female head coach in the NBA's Summer League when the Spurs announced she would coach their summer league team. Hammon led the Spurs to the Las Vegas Summer League title on July 20, 2015, becoming the first female NBA head coach to win a Summer League title.

At the 2016 NBA All-Star Game, Hammon became the first woman to be part of an All-Star coaching staff. On June 2, 2017, Hammon was interviewed for the position of general manager of the Milwaukee Bucks; she was not considered as a finalist for the position.

During her seventh season with the San Antonio Spurs, on December 30, 2020, Gregg Popovich was ejected in the second quarter of the Spurs' 121–107 loss to the Los Angeles Lakers, and Hammon became the first female acting head coach in NBA history.

Hammon was hired as the head coach for the Las Vegas Aces in December 2021. The Aces won the 2022 WNBA Finals and Hammon became the first rookie head coach to win the WNBA Title.

Coaching record

|-style="background:#FDE910;"
| style="text-align:left;" | LVA
| style="text-align:left;" | 2022
| 36 || 26 || 10 || || style="text-align:center;" | 1st in Western || 10 || 8 || 2 || 
| style="text-align:center;"| Won WNBA Championship
|- class="sortbottom"
| style="text-align:center;" colspan="2"|Career
| 36 || 26 || 10 ||  ||   || 10 || 8 || 2 || ||

WNBA career statistics

Regular season

|-
| style="text-align:left;"|1999
| style="text-align:left;"|New York
| 30 || 1 || 6.7 || .422 || .289 || .882 || .6 || .6 || .2 || .0 || .8 || 2.7
|-
| style="text-align:left;"|2000
| style="text-align:left;"|New York
| 32 || 16 || 26.1 || .472 || .369 || .884 || 2.0 || 1.8 || .9 || .0 || 1.9 || 12.0
|-
| style="text-align:left;"|2001
| style="text-align:left;"|New York
| 32 || 0 || 19.3 || .457 || .378 || .784 || 1.6 || 1.6 || .8 || .0 || 1.5 || 8.2
|-
| style="text-align:left;"|2002
| style="text-align:left;"|New York
| 32 || 1 || 20.6 || .442 || .386 || .679 || 2.1 || 1.7 || .8 || .0 || 1.7 || 8.0
|-
| style="text-align:left;"|2003
| style="text-align:left;"|New York
| 11 || 2 || 23.4 || .575 || style="background:#D3D3D3;"|.469° || style="background:#D3D3D3;"|.951° || 1.9 || 1.6 || .9 || .1 || 2.4 || 14.7
|-
| style="text-align:left;"|2004
| style="text-align:left;"|New York
| 34 || 34 || 33.2 || .432 || .335 || .836 || 3.5 || 4.4 || 1.7 || .1 || 3.4 || 13.5
|-
| style="text-align:left;"|2005
| style="text-align:left;"|New York
| 34 || 34 || 34.7 || .432 || .365 || style="background:#D3D3D3;"|.901° || 3.4 || 4.3 || 1.8 || .1 || 3.1 || 13.9
|-
| style="text-align:left;"|2006
| style="text-align:left;"|New York
| 22 || 20 || 30.8 || .425 || .343 || style="background:#D3D3D3;"|.960° || 3.0 || 3.7 || 1.3 || .1 || 2.9 || 14.7
|-
| style="text-align:left;"|2007
| style="text-align:left;"|San Antonio
| 28 || 26 || 33.4 || .445 || .404 || style="background:#D3D3D3;"|.931° || 2.8 || style="background:#D3D3D3;"|5.0° || .8 || .2 || 4.0 || 18.8
|-
| style="text-align:left;"|2008
| style="text-align:left;"|San Antonio
| 33 || 33 || 33.4 || .390 || .350 || .937 || 2.8 || 4.9 || 1.3 || .2 || 3.1 || 17.6
|-
| style="text-align:left;"|2009
| style="text-align:left;"|San Antonio
| 31 || 31 || 33.8 || .447 || .369 || .901 || 3.3 || 5.0 || 1.6 || .4 || 3.5 || 19.5
|-
| style="text-align:left;"|2010
| style="text-align:left;"|San Antonio
| 32 || 32 || 33.6 || .442 || .390 || style="background:#D3D3D3;"|.960° || 2.9 || 5.4 || 1.1 || .2 || 3.3 || 15.1
|-
| style="text-align:left;"|2011
| style="text-align:left;"|San Antonio
| 33 || 33 || 31.8 || .440 || .389 || .892 || 2.9 || 5.8 || 1.5 || .2 || 3.6 || 15.9
|-
| style="text-align:left;"|2012
| style="text-align:left;"|San Antonio
| 33 || 33 || 30.2 || .441 || .435 || .876 || 2.5 || 5.3 || .9 || .2 || 3.2 || 14.7
|-
| style="text-align:left;"|2013
| style="text-align:left;"|San Antonio
| 1 || 1 || 12.0 || .333 || .000 || .000 || 1.0 || 1.0 || .0 || .0 || 3.0 || 2.0
|-
| style="text-align:left;"|2014
| style="text-align:left;"|San Antonio
| 32 || 32 || 24.5 || .417 || .398 || style="background:#E0CEF2;"|1.000 || 1.4 || 4.2 || .4 || .1 || 1.6 || 9.1
|- class="sortbottom"
| style="text-align:center;" colspan="2"|Career
| 450 || 329 || 27.9 || .438 || .378 || .897 || 2.5 || 3.8 || 1.1 || .1 || 2.7 || 13.9

Playoffs

|-
| style="text-align:left;"|1999
| style="text-align:left;"|New York
| 6 || 0 || 8.3 || .167 || .222 || 1.000 || .2 || .8 || .0 || .0 || 1.0 || 2.0
|-
| style="text-align:left;"|2000
| style="text-align:left;"|New York
| 7 || 7 || 29.4 || .429 || .304 || .895 || 1.4 || 2.1 || 1.3 || .0 || 2.4 || 9.4
|-
| style="text-align:left;"|2001
| style="text-align:left;"|New York
| 6 || 0 || 8.0 || .353 || .300 || .000 || .5 || .3 || .2 || .0 || .5 || 2.5
|-
| style="text-align:left;"|2002
| style="text-align:left;"|New York
| 8 || 0 || 22.9 || .537 || .424 || .875 || 2.1 || 2.0 || .6 || .0 || 1.3 || 9.9
|-
| style="text-align:left;"|2004
| style="text-align:left;"|New York
| 5 || 5 || 35.6 || .392 || .333 || .400 || 2.6 || 3.4 || 1.2 || .0 || 3.8 || 10.6
|-
| style="text-align:left;"|2005
| style="text-align:left;"|New York
| 2 || 2 || 38.0 || .450 || .286 || 1.000 || 3.5 || 2.0 || .0 || .0 || 5.0 || 11.5
|-
| style="text-align:left;"|2007
| style="text-align:left;"|San Antonio
| 5 || 5 || 35.0 || .413 || .444 || .800 || 2.8 || 5.0 || 1.2 || .2 || 3.2 || 20.8
|-
| style="text-align:left;"|2008
| style="text-align:left;"|San Antonio
| 9 || 9 || 36.8 || .421 || .458 || .895 || 2.3 || 4.6 || 1.0 || 0.6 || 3.4 || 18.1
|-
| style="text-align:left;"|2009
| style="text-align:left;"|San Antonio
| 3 || 3 || 33.7 || .463 || .381 || .900 || 2.7 || 2.0 || 1.7 || .0 || 2.3 || 18.3
|-
| style="text-align:left;"|2010
| style="text-align:left;"|San Antonio
| 2 || 2 || 37.0 || .393 || .389 || 1.000 || 3.5 || 5.5 || .5 || .0 || 4.0 || 20.0
|-
| style="text-align:left;"|2011
| style="text-align:left;"|San Antonio
| 3 || 3 || 34.7 || .350 || .391 || .857 || 2.7 || 4.3 || 1.7 || .7 || 3.0 || 16.3
|-
| style="text-align:left;"|2012
| style="text-align:left;"|San Antonio
| 2 || 2 || 35.0 || .500 || .364 || 1.000 || 3.0 || 4.5 || 1.0 || .0 || 3.5 || 17.0
|-
| style="text-align:left;"|2014
| style="text-align:left;"|San Antonio
| 2 || 2 || 28.5 || .526 || .500 || 1.000 || 3.5 || 4.5 || 1.5 || .0 || 2.5 || 14.5
|- class="sortbottom"
| style="text-align:center;" colspan="2"|Career
| 60 || 40 || 27.5 || .426 || .390 || .889 || 2.0 || 2.9 || .9 || .1 || 2.4 || 12.0

National team career

United States

Hammon was named to the team representing the United States at the 1998 William Jones Cup competition in Taipei, Taiwan. The U.S. team, coached by Nell Fortner, won all five games, earning the gold medal for the competition. Hammon scored 18 points over the five games.

Russia
In 2008, after learning that she would not be invited to try out for the U.S. national team, Hammon announced she would try to claim a roster slot on the Russian national team in the 2008 Olympics in Beijing. Hammon became a Russian citizen in 2008. The coach of Russia's team, Igor Grudin, was also the sports director of the CSKA team that Hammon played for in Moscow during the WNBA off-season. Hammon also signed a three-year extension with CSKA Moscow at around the same time she was named as a prospect for the national team.

Hammon's decision to play for Russia was controversial in American basketball. In some circles she was branded an American traitor, with then-U.S. national coach Anne Donovan questioning her patriotism. "If you play in this country, live in this country, and you grow up in the heartland and you put on a Russian uniform, you are not a patriotic person in my mind," Donovan said.

Hammon responded to Donovan's criticism saying, "You don't know me. You don't know what that flag means to me. You don't know how I grew up. The biggest honor in our classroom was who could put up the (American) flag, roll it up right, not let the corners touch the ground. Obviously we definitely define patriotism differently." She has also stated. "I love my country. I love our national anthem. It absolutely gives me chills sometimes. I feel honored to be an American, to be from America because of what we stand for." Hammon said she played for Russia primarily to play on the Olympic stage, and it was not a purely financial decision. However, by obtaining Russian citizenship, her salary with CSKA tripled, and she was eligible to make $250,000 for winning a gold medal for Russia from the government. She would have received a $150,000 bonus for winning a silver medal.

Since then, Anne Donovan changed her position, stating "I don't know that I have any strong thoughts on [Becky Hammon joining the Russian national team] anymore. Even at the time. I've known marathon runners in particular that I've watched over the years have represented other countries. I've watched other athletes do it."
She also said:The thing that took me off guard with Becky was that it hasn't happened in women's basketball before. And again, the  that: that we didn't ask her to participate, that we didn't ask her to try out for our team, that's really what I had the most issue with. Becky made a great business decision and this was a great opportunity for her to get to the Olympic Games. I hold no grudge and more power to her. But the  it when it first came out were not accurate. Becky came, had a great experience; I'm glad we're going to the gold medal game.

Hammon shot 1-for-6 from the field in a 67–52 loss to the United States in the 2008 Olympic Semifinals, but helped the Russian team to win the bronze medal by scoring 22 points against China. She played for Russia at EuroBasket 2009, the 2010 World Championship and the 2012 Olympics.

In response to the detainment of Brittney Griner in Russia due to alleged drug possession in 2022, Hammon joined other athletes to call for the release of Griner, and stated that her Russian citizenship had expired.

Popular culture
Hammon was shown in Marie Claire magazine's "The 8 Greatest Moments for Women in Sports".

See also 
 List of female NBA coaches

References

External links

 
 
 
 
 
 
 

1977 births
Living people
All-American college women's basketball players
Russian women's basketball players
American women's basketball players
American Christians
American emigrants to Russia
American women's basketball coaches
Basketball coaches from South Dakota
Basketball players at the 2008 Summer Olympics
Basketball players at the 2012 Summer Olympics
Basketball players from South Dakota
Basketball players with retired numbers
Colorado State Rams women's basketball players
Las Vegas Aces coaches
LGBT basketball players
LGBT people from South Dakota
Lesbian sportswomen
Medalists at the 2008 Summer Olympics
Naturalised citizens of Russia
New York Liberty players
Olympic basketball players of Russia
Olympic bronze medalists for Russia
Olympic medalists in basketball
Point guards
Russian basketball coaches
Russian Christians
Russian people of American descent
San Antonio Spurs assistant coaches
San Antonio Stars players
Sportspeople from Rapid City, South Dakota
Undrafted Women's National Basketball Association players
Women's National Basketball Association All-Stars
Women's National Basketball Association championship-winning head coaches